The Kuntsevo Dacha was Joseph Stalin's personal residence near the former town of Kuntsevo (then Moscow Oblast, now part of Moscow's Fili district), where he lived for the last two decades of his life and died on 5 March 1953, although he also spent much time inside the Kremlin, where he possessed living quarters next to his offices. The dacha is located inside a forest not far from the modern-day Victory Park.

Also called the "nearer dacha", it was built in 1933–34 to Miron Merzhanov's designs. One storey was added to the original building in 1943. Stalin lived in Kuntsevo during World War II. It was there that he played host to such high-profile guests as Winston Churchill and Mao Zedong.

Description
The dacha is located at the heart of a densely wooded birch forest; its defenses included a double-perimeter fence, camouflaged 30-millimeter antiaircraft guns, and a security force of three hundred NKVD (after 1946, MGB) special troops. The grounds included lemon and apple trees, a rose garden, a small pond, and a watermelon patch which Stalin liked to cultivate. There was also a sports ground for playing gorodki.

Upon entering the dacha, there was a lobby with two cloakrooms; to the left a door opened to Stalin's personal study, where he spent most of the day. Directly in front, a door opened to the large dining room, while to the right there was a long narrow corridor.

The rectangular dining room was dominated by a long polished table and covered with rose carpets. It was decorated with images of Vladimir Lenin and of the writer Maxim Gorky. It was in this room that Stalin welcomed the Soviet Politburo for meetings and late-night dinners, and where important decisions were often taken. An "almost invisible" door placed on the wall in one side of the dining room led to Stalin's bedroom, and to a kitchen.

On the left-hand side of the dacha, there was Stalin's personal study (where he spent most of the day when at Kuntsevo) with his large war-time desk, a radio that was a gift from Winston Churchill (when he first visited Moscow, in August 1942) and a couch; Stalin preferred to sleep on this couch, instead of his bedroom. The bathroom was located next to Stalin's study.

On the right-hand side, the long narrow corridor led initially to two bedrooms (mostly used for accommodating occasional guests) and eventually to a large open veranda. Stalin spent much time in this veranda; he would sit in a chair there during winter, despite the heavy cold, wearing a warm sheepskin coat and a fur hat. He also liked to read books and reports and feed the birds while at the veranda.

The Soviet leader seldom left his study, let alone visited the second storey (although a lift was installed on his orders). This storey was originally intended to accommodate his daughter Svetlana, but she used to stay there for only a few days each year. As a result, the rooms there remained dark and empty for most of the time.

After Stalin's death the Marx–Engels–Lenin–Stalin Institute set up a commission to make arrangements for a Stalin museum at Kuntsevo.
Nikita Khrushchev discarded the idea, and the dacha stood unoccupied for several decades.

Stalin's daughter Svetlana Alliluyeva recorded that a copy of the famous painting Reply of the Zaporozhian Cossacks was hung somewhere on the ground floor but was not clear on exactly where.

The dacha today

The building remains shrouded in secrecy: the grounds are fenced and closed to ordinary visitors. However, the dacha is still preserved in good condition, along with all of Stalin's personal belongings, including his study with the war-time desk and the sofa where he slept.

Upon becoming  President of the Russian Federation in 2000, Vladimir Putin summoned the most powerful business  oligarchs of Russia to Kuntsevo in what Sergei Pugachev (a participant in that meeting) described as a "very symbolic" move; another participant, Mikhail Khodorkovsky, said that by summoning them to Kuntsevo and by sitting in Stalin's office, Putin "wanted us to understand that we, as big businessmen, may have some power, but it is nothing compared to his power as the head of state."  (Khodorkovsky "did not take that message to heart" and wound up serving 10 years in prison on charges of tax evasion.)

References

External links 
 Vintage photographs of the dacha's interiors

Buildings and structures in Moscow
Residential buildings completed in 1934
Places associated with Joseph Stalin
Dachas
Buildings and structures built in the Soviet Union
1934 establishments in the Soviet Union